The International Programme on Chemical Safety (IPCS) was formed in 1980 and is a collaboration between three United Nations bodies, the World Health Organization, the International Labour Organization and the United Nations Environment Programme, to establish a scientific basis for safe use of chemicals and to strengthen national capabilities and capacities for chemical safety.

A related joint project with the same aim, IPCS INCHEM, is a collaboration between IPCS and the Canadian Centre for Occupational Health and Safety (CCOHS).

The IPCS identifies the following as "chemicals of major public health concern":
Air pollution
Arsenic
Asbestos
Benzene
Cadmium
Dioxin and dioxin-like substances
Inadequate or excess fluoride
Lead
Mercury
Highly hazardous pesticides

See also 
 Acceptable daily intake
International Chemical Safety Card
Concise International Chemical Assessment Document
 Food safety

References

External links
Official WHO site
Official site

Chemical safety
World Health Organization
International Labour Organization
United Nations Environment Programme